Jeanne Novotny is Dean and Professor at the Fairfield University School of Nursing located in Fairfield, Connecticut. Novotny was named a 2002 Fellow of the American Academy of Nursing in recognition of her outstanding contributions to nursing. She received two Book of the Year Awards from the American Journal of Nursing for Distance Education in Nursing (Springer Publishing Company; 2nd edition, 2005) and The Nuts and Bolts of Teaching Nursing (Springer Publishing Company; 3rd Edition, 2006).

Career
Prior to arriving at Fairfield University, Novotny was the associate dean for academic programs at the Frances Payne Bolton School of Nursing, Case Western Reserve University and was interim director of the World Health Organization Collaborating Center, consulting on 16 health-related initiatives in eight countries and the U.S.

Education
Novotny received her bachelor's and master of science degrees in nursing from Ohio State University and her Ph.D. from Kent State University.

References

External links
Jeanne M. Novotny, PhD, RN, FAAN
Fairfield University School of Nursing

Fairfield University faculty
Living people
Fellows of the American Academy of Nursing
American nurses
American women nurses
Nursing school deans
Nursing educators
Nursing researchers
Women academic administrators
American academic administrators
Year of birth missing (living people)
American women academics
Ohio State University alumni
Kent State University alumni
Case Western Reserve University alumni
21st-century American women